|}

The Bet365 Select Hurdle is a Grade 2 National Hunt hurdle race in Great Britain which is open to horses aged four years or older. 
It is run at Sandown Park over a distance of about 2 miles and  5½f furlongs, and it is scheduled to take place each year in April.

The race was first run in 2014 and was upgraded from Listed to Grade 2 status from the 2017 running.

Records
Most successful horse (2 wins):
 Younevercall (2019, 2021)

Leading jockey (3 wins):
 David Bass - Polly Peachum (2015), Younevercall (2019, 2021)

Leading trainer (3 wins):
 Nicky Henderson - Polly Peachum (2015), L'Ami Serge (2017), Call Me Lord (2018)
 Paul Nicholls - Southfield Theatre (2014), Ptit Zig (2016), McFabulous (2022)

Winners

See also
 Horse racing in Great Britain
 List of British National Hunt races

References
 
Racing Post: 

National Hunt races in Great Britain
National Hunt hurdle races
Sandown Park Racecourse
Recurring sporting events established in 2014
2014 establishments in England